Xinjing is a town in the Changning District of Shanghai. , it has 33 residential communities under its administration.

References

Towns in Shanghai
Changning District